Brooke T. Mossman is an American pathologist, a University Distinguished Professor emeritus at the University of Vermont. She is known for her research on diseases caused by asbestos.

References

Place of birth missing (living people)
Year of birth missing (living people)
Living people
University of Vermont faculty
American pathologists
University of Vermont alumni
21st-century American women